Bouteloua radicosa, colloquially known as purple grama, is a grass species in the grama genus native to the southwestern United States and northern Mexico.

Description 
Each spikelet bears two florets. The lower floret has a three awned lemma.

B. radicosa may hybridize with Bouteloua repens and Bouteloua williamsii, which could contribute to its apparent diversity.

Distribution 
It is present in Arizona, New Mexico, and California. It was introduced to Maine, although it remains uncommon there.

References 

eludens
Grasses of North America
Grasses of Mexico
Grasses of the United States
Drought-tolerant plants
Warm-season grasses of North America